The Witcher is a fantasy drama television series created by Lauren Schmidt Hissrich for Netflix. It is based on the book series of the same name by Polish writer Andrzej Sapkowski. Set on a fictional, medieval-inspired landmass known as the Continent, The Witcher explores the legend of Geralt of Rivia, Yennefer of Vengerberg and Princess Ciri. It stars Henry Cavill, Anya Chalotra, and Freya Allan.

The first season, consisting of eight episodes, was released on Netflix on December 20, 2019. It was based on The Last Wish and Sword of Destiny, which are collections of short stories that precede the main The Witcher saga. The second season, also consisting of eight episodes and based on the novel Blood of Elves, released on December 17, 2021. In September 2021, Netflix renewed the series for a third season, which will be released in mid-2023.   This will be followed by a fourth season, with Liam Hemsworth taking over the role of Geralt of Rivia.

An animated origin story film, The Witcher: Nightmare of the Wolf, was released on August 23, 2021. A prequel miniseries, The Witcher: Blood Origin, was released on December 25, 2022.

Synopsis

The story begins with Geralt of Rivia, Crown Princess Ciri of Cintra, and the sorceress Yennefer of Vengerberg at different points of time, exploring formative events that shape their characters throughout the first season, before eventually merging into a single timeline.

Geralt and Ciri are linked by destiny since before she was born when he unknowingly demanded her as a reward for his services by invoking "the Law of Surprise". After the two finally meet, Geralt becomes the princess's protector and must help her and fight against her various pursuers to prevent her Elder Blood and powerful magic from being used for malevolent purposes and keep Ciri and their world safe.

Cast and characters

Main

 Henry Cavill as Geralt of Rivia, a magically enhanced monster hunter known as a "witcher". Cintran princess Ciri is his "destiny".
 Anya Chalotra as Yennefer of Vengerberg, a quarter-elf sorceress.
 Freya Allan as Ciri, Cirilla Fiona Elen Riannon, the crown princess of Cintra, granddaughter of Queen Calanthe and daughter of Pavetta, from whom she inherited the Elder Blood. She is linked to Geralt by destiny.
 Eamon Farren as Cahir Mawr Dyffryn aep Ceallach, nicknamed the “Black Knight”, a Nilfgaardian army commander who leads the invasion of Cintra and the hunt for Cirilla.
 Joey Batey as Jaskier, a travelling bard who befriends Geralt and accompanies him on his path.
 MyAnna Buring as Tissaia de Vries, mentor to Yennefer and the Rectrix of Aretuza, a training academy for female mages.
 Mimî M. Khayisa as Fringilla Vigo, a sorceress who trained alongside Yennefer. She eventually leads the Nilfgaardian invasion alongside Cahir.
 Anna Shaffer as Triss Merigold, a sorceress, the court mage of Temeria and advisor to King Foltest.
 Royce Pierreson as Istredd, an adept sorcerer and historian who befriends Yennefer at Aretuza.
 Wilson Mbomio as Dara, a refugee elf boy whom Cirilla befriends after the Slaughter of Cintra.
 Mahesh Jadu as Vilgefortz of Roggeveen, a charismatic sorcerer who rallies the northern mages to halt the invading Nilfgaardian army in Sodden.
 Tom Canton as Filavandrel (season 2; guest season 1), the last king of the Elves.
 Mecia Simson as Francesca Findabair (season 2), an elven sorceress. 
 Kim Bodnia as Vesemir (season 2), the oldest living witcher and Geralt's mentor and father figure.
 Theo James has a vocal cameo in Season 1 as a young Vesemir. He reprises his role in the animated prequel film The Witcher: Nightmare of the Wolf.

Recurring
 Jodhi May as Queen Calanthe, ruler of the Kingdom of Cintra and grandmother of Princess Cirilla.
 Adam Levy as Mousesack, the court druid of Cintra and advisor to Queen Calanthe.
 Björn Hlynur Haraldsson as King Eist Tuirseach, husband to Queen Calanthe and step-grandfather of Cirilla. (season 1)
 Lars Mikkelsen as Stregobor, resident mage in the town of Blaviken and the Rector of Ban Ard, the academy for male mages.
 Therica Wilson-Read as Sabrina Glevissig, a sorceress who trained alongside Yennefer.
 Shaun Dooley as King Foltest, the king of Temeria, whose incestuous relationship with his sister created a daughter.
 Terence Maynard as Artorius Vigo, court mage from Toussaint and uncle of Fringilla
 Judit Fekete as Vanielle of Brugge, a sorceress and one of the mages who fought during the Battle of Sodden Hill. (season 1)
 Paul Bullion as Lambert, a witcher at Kaer Morhen and friend of Geralt. (season 2)
 Yasen Atour as Coën, a witcher at Kaer Morhen and friend of Geralt. (season 2)
 Ania Marson as Voleth Meir, a demon who came to the plane with the Conjunction of the Spheres, who feeds on pain and fear. (season 2)
 Graham McTavish as Sigismund Dijkstra, head of the Redanian Intelligence and ally of Philippa Eilhart. (season 2); McTavish also voiced Deglan in the animated prequel Nightmare of the Wolf.
 Ed Birch as Vizimir, the king of Redania. (season 2)
 Chris Fulton as Rience, a renegade mage set on a hunt for Ciri. (season 2)
 Aisha Fabienne Ross as Lydia van Bredevoort, Rience's liaison who gets him out of prison on her master's orders. (season 2)
 Kaine Zajaz as Gage, Francesca's brother. (season 2)

Notable guest stars

Introduced in season 1
 Emma Appleton as Renfri of Creyden, a princess-turned-bandit who leads a gang of brigands and has a bloody grudge against Stregobor.
 Mia McKenna-Bruce as Marilka, daughter of Blaviken's alderman.
 Tobi Bamtefa as Sir Danek, a Cintran commander of Calanthe's royal guard.
 Maciej Musiał as Sir Lazlo, a Cintran knight charged with protecting Cirilla.
 Natasha Culzac as Toruviel, an elven warrior serving Filavandrel.
 Amit Shah as Torque, a sylvan ("horned devil") who works for Filavandrel.
 Julian Rhind-Tutt as Giltine, the enchanter of Aretuza who brings adepts into their perfect physical forms after they graduate.
 Gaia Mondadori as Princess Pavetta, the daughter of Queen Calanthe and mother of Ciri.
 Bart Edwards as Duny, the "Urcheon of Erlenwald" / Emperor Emhyr var Emreis, Pavetta's lover, once afflicted by a curse that transformed him into a hedgehog man until midnight. His marriage to Pavetta removes the curse. He is Ciri's father.
 Josette Simon as Eithne, the Queen of the Dryads of Brokilon Forest.
 Nóra Trokán as the Dryad General.
 Marcin Czarnik as Ronin Mage, an assassin sent to murder Queen Kalis and her baby daughter.
 Blair Kincaid as Crach an Craite, a member of a royal clan from the Skellige Isles, who was invited to Pavetta's betrothal event.
 Lucas Englander as Chireadan, a healer elf from the Redanian city of Rinde.
 Jordan Renzo as Eyck of Denesle, a virtuous yet pompous knight.
 Ron Cook as Borch Three Jackdaws, a man who is actually the golden dragon Villentretenmerth.
 Jeremy Crawford as Yarpen Zigrin, the leader of a gang of dwarven mercenaries and friend of Geralt.
 Ella-Rae Smith as Fola, a young sorceress in Aretuza.
 Francis Magee as Yurga, a travelling merchant in Sodden, rescued from monsters by Geralt.
 Anna-Louise Plowman as Zola, Yurga's wife who offers Cirilla sanctuary in her rural home in Sodden.
 Frida Gustavsson as Ma/Visenna, mother of Geralt of Rivia.

Introduced in season 2
 Kristofer Hivju as Nivellen, an aristocrat who has been transformed into a beast through a curse.
 Agnes Born as Vereena, a bruxa and Nivellen's lover.
 Basil Eidenbenz as Eskel, a witcher at Kaer Morhen and close friend of Geralt.
 Jota Castellano as Gwain, a witcher at Kaer Morhen.
 Nathanial Jacobs as Everard, a witcher at Kaer Morhen.
 Chuey Okoye as Merek, a witcher at Kaer Morhen.
 Kevin Doyle as Ba'lian, an elf seeking refuge in the most unexpected places of the Continent.
 Niamh McCormack as Lara Dorren, an extremely powerful, ancient Elven sorceress who fell in love with a human mage, Ciri's ancestor.
 Adjoa Andoh as Mother Nenneke, the wise High Priestess of the Temple of Melitele in Ellander and an old friend of Geralt.
 Simon Callow as Codringher, an investigator and partner of Fenn who helps Istredd.
 Liz Carr as Fenn, an investigator and partner of Codringher who helps Istredd.
 Rebecca Hanssen as Meve, queen of Lyria.
 Richard Tirado as Demavend, king of Aedirn.
 Edward Rowe as Henselt, king of Kaedwen.
 Luke Cy as Ethain, king of Cidaris.
 Sam Hazeldine as Eredin, king of the legendary Wild Hunt.
 Cassie Clare as Philippa Eilhart, a sorceress and advisor to king Vizimir of Redania, as well as Dijkstra's favored spy.

Episodes

Season 1 (2019)
The first season is based on The Last Wish and Sword of Destiny. A website with timelines for the show, along with in-depth summaries of events, was later created by Netflix.

Season 2 (2021)
The second season is based on "A Grain of Truth" from The Last Wish, Blood of Elves, and the beginning of Time of Contempt.

Season 3

Production

Development
Andrzej Sapkowski's The Witcher book series was initially scheduled to be adapted into a standalone Netflix film, but Kelly Luegenbiehl, Vice President of International Originals at Netflix, dissuaded the producers. She recalled asking them, "How can you take eight novels and just turn it into a film? There's so much material here. Through a number of conversations, the producers got really excited about the idea of using the source material for a longer-running series." In May 2017, Netflix announced the start of production on an English-language drama TV series based on the books.

In December 2017, it was reported that Lauren Schmidt Hissrich would serve as showrunner on the show. In April 2018, Schmidt Hissrich revealed that the script for the pilot episode was finished, and the first season would be eight episodes long. In 2017, it was reported that Andrzej Sapkowski would serve as a creative consultant on the show, but in January 2018, Sapkowski denied any direct involvement. However, he met with Schmidt Hissrich in April 2018 and in May 2018 she stated that Sapkowski was on the creative team of the project. In August, Andrew Laws was revealed as production designer. In December, Radio Times reported directors Alik Sakharov and Charlotte Brändström had joined the project.

Netflix announced a second season on November 13, 2019, under the working title "Mysterious Monsters", with production set to begin in London in early 2020, for a planned release in 2021. In April 2021, Netflix's co-chief executive officer and chief content officer Ted Sarandos confirmed that the second season is expected to premiere in Q4 2021. In July 2021, it was announced that the second season would premiere on December 17, 2021. On September 25, 2021, Netflix announced that the series had been renewed for a third season.

Writing
The first season was told in a non-linear manner, spanning different time periods. Hissrich said this was inspired by Christopher Nolan's 2017 film Dunkirk. She pointed out that Yennefer's story covers around 70 years and Ciri's only about 2 weeks. Hissrich also said that Yennefer and Cirilla were given more prominence to allow the viewers to understand them better. By showing their backstories, along with Geralt's, "we get down to the soul of the story. It's the story of a broken family. It's a story of three people who are on their own in the world, really orphans all living in the margins of society who are determined to not need anyone, and yet of course they do."

Hissrich said the story for the second season will build on the foundations of the first season, becoming more focused; the characters will interact with each other more frequently. "When I talk about The Witcher, I always talk about how these three characters coming together — Geralt, Ciri, and Yennefer — they come together as a family. It's the most important part of the series for me," Hissrich said. "And when you start to imagine someone's family, you also need to understand their family of origin. For Geralt, it's his brothers, it's the brotherhood of the witchers. So I'm really excited to get back in and meet Vesemir, his father figure, for the first time and all of these men that he was raised with since he was seven years old."

Casting

In September 2018, Netflix announced that Henry Cavill would play Geralt of Rivia. He was selected from more than 200 actors; Cavill actively campaigned for the role, being a long-time fan of the video game adaptations. In October 2018, Freya Allan and Anya Chalotra were cast as Princess Cirilla and Yennefer of Vengerberg respectively, while Jodhi May, Björn Hlynur Haraldsson, Adam Levy, MyAnna Buring, Mimi Ndiweni, and Therica Wilson-Read also joined. More casting was announced later that month, including Eamon Farren, Joey Batey, Lars Mikkelsen, Royce Pierreson, Maciej Musiał, Wilson Radjou-Pujalte, and Anna Shaffer.

In February 2020, Netflix announced Kim Bodnia had been cast as Vesemir, an experienced witcher and a mentor to Geralt. Other additions included Kristofer Hivju, Yasen Atour, Agnes Born, Paul Bullion, Thue Ersted Rasmussen, Aisha Fabienne Ross, and Mecia Simson. In September 2020, it was announced that Basil Eidenbenz would replace Rasmussen in the role of Eskel. In November 2020, Rebecca Hanssen was announced for the role of Queen Meve.

In March 2021, Kevin Doyle was cast as Ba'Lian, an original character who does not appear in the novels. Cassie Clare, Adjoa Andoh, Liz Carr, Simon Callow, Graham McTavish, and Chris Fulton were cast as Philippa Eilhart, Nenneke, Fenn, Codringher, Dijkstra, and Rience, respectively.

In April 2022, Robbie Amell, Meng'er Zhang, Hugh Skinner, and Christelle Elwin joined the cast in the third season with recurring roles. In July 2022, Michalina Olszańska, Ryan Hayes, Kate Winter, Martyn Ellis, Harvey Quinn, and Poppy Almond were cast.

In October 2022, Netflix announced that Liam Hemsworth would be replacing Henry Cavill as Geralt of Rivia from the start of Season 4.

Filming
In April 2018, Schmidt Hissrich revealed that the show would be filmed in Central and Eastern Europe.

Principal photography for the first season began on October 31, 2018, in Hungary. Much of the series was filmed at Mafilm Studios near Budapest; the outdoor set included the exterior of wizard  Stregobor's household. The hall in Cintra was constructed at Origo Studios on the outskirts of Budapest. Fort Monostor (Monostori Erőd) and the nearby forest was used for some exterior scenes in Cintra. The Battle of Marnadal was filmed in the hills of a village in Hungary, Csákberény. The production used the exteriors of Burg Kreuzenstein, a castle near Leobendorf, Austria, for the abandoned fictional castle Vizima, but the interiors were filmed at Origo Studios.

In March 2019, production commenced on Gran Canaria, in the Canary Islands, Spain. Some scenes were to be shot on the islands of La Palma and La Gomera, as well. Scenes of the Sorcerers' Aretuza Academy (Tower of the Gull) were shot on Roque de Santo Domingo in Garafía, an islet, and enhanced with CGI. The interiors, however, used for the graduation ball were at the Kiscelli Museum in Óbuda. The museum was a monastery in the 18th century. This location was also used for the conclave of the Northern Mages. The Barranco de Fataga area on Gran Canaria island was used for some scenes of arid landscapes. Scenes of Ciri traveling in the desert were filmed in the Natural Dune Reserve of Maspalomas on Gran Canaria. Most of episode six was filmed on La Palma island.

Filming of the first season concluded in Ogrodzieniec Castle in Poland. The ruins of this medieval castle, dating from the 1300s, were the backdrop for scenes including the fictional Vilgefortz of Roggeveen and Triss Merigold. The ruins were also included when shooting the Battle of Sodden Hill in the final episode of Season 1. Filming for the first season wrapped in May 2019.

Filming for the second season began in London in early 2020, but was halted for two weeks in March due to concerns over the COVID-19 pandemic and actor Kristofer Hivju's confirmation that he tested positive for COVID-19. Then, in May 2020, film and television productions that were filming in the UK were given permission to resume filming, including season two of The Witcher. The show resumed pre-production in July and officially resumed filming on August 12, 2020, with filming for the second season expected to extend into early 2021. On November 7, 2020, production was halted again after a number of crew members had tested positive for COVID-19. Production resumed two weeks later on November 24, 2020, and continued in December despite Cavill's on-set injury. Filming for the second season wrapped on April 2, 2021.

Filming locations for the second season were all in the UK and included Cathedral Cave and Hodge Close Quarry in the Lake District, Low Force Waterfall in the North Pennines and Bourne Wood in Farnham.

Filming for the third season began on April 4, 2022. It wrapped in September 2022.

Music

Sonya Belousova and Giona Ostinelli composed the soundtrack for the first season. The duo collaborated with several soloists and artists; the soundtrack features many medieval instruments to match the medieval-inspired setting of the series. More than 60 different instruments from around the world were used to create the soundtrack. The original song "Toss a Coin to Your Witcher", composed by Belousova and Ostinelli and sung by Batey in the second episode, became a viral hit shortly after the series's release. Users have created mods to patch the song into the video game adaptions of The Witcher. All violin solos for the  series were performed by Lindsay Deutsch.

In October 2021, it was confirmed that Joseph Trapanese would be scoring the soundtrack for the second season. Trapanese, having previously collaborated with Netflix as the composer for Shadow & Bone, replaced Belousova and Ostinelli. Showrunner Lauren Schmidt Hissrich also revealed that new songs performed by Batey would featured in the soundtrack.

Marketing
Netflix released the first teaser for the series at San Diego Comic-Con on July 19, 2019. The first full trailer was revealed at Lucca Comics & Games on October 31, 2019. Netflix released a final trailer on December 12, 2019. On October 29, 2021, Netflix released the official trailer for season 2.

Release
In April 2019, Netflix's Ted Sarandos told investors in an earnings call that the series would be released in late 2019. The series premiered on December 20, 2019. The second season premiered on December 17, 2021. The third season is set to premiere in mid-2023.

Specials 
On August 26, 2020, a making-of about the first season of the show titled Making The Witcher was released on Netflix. On September 2, 2020, the making-of series The Witcher: A Look Inside the Episodes premiered on Netflix.

With the release of the second season, Netflix released on December 17, 2021, Making the Witcher: Season 2, The Witcher Bestiary Season 1, Part 1, The Witcher Bestiary Season 1, Part 2, The Characters of the Continent, and The Witcher: Fireplace.

Reception

Critical reception

Season 1
For the first season, Rotten Tomatoes collected 91 reviews and identified 68% of them as positive, with an average rating of 6.26/10. The website's critics consensus reads: "Though the world of The Witcher at times feels only half-formed, Henry Cavill brings brawny charisma to a series teeming with subversive fantasy elements and dark humor." Metacritic calculated a weighted average score of 54 out of 100 based on 17 critics, indicating "mixed or average reviews".

In a positive review of the first season, Erik Kain of Forbes wrote, "If you're looking for an original dark fantasy with some horror elements, some bare skin and plenty of blood and gore (and monsters) look no further.", while James Whitbrook of io9 said, "if you are willing to sit through those trudging opening episodes, punctuated by a cool fight here or an intriguing character scene there, The Witcher slowly but surely finds itself a fantastical slice of bloody, schlocky fun." Conversely, Entertainment Weekly critic Darren Franich said, "my destiny is to never watch this borefest ever again", awarding the first season an F rating. Franich drew criticism when he confessed to watching only the first, second, and fifth episodes. Raisa Bruner from Time gave a positive review to the show and commented: "each episode gets stronger as the season progresses, and ultimately satisfies the fantasy itch." Scott Bryan from the BBC, was more negative towards the show by criticizing it for relying too much on the gameplays, and how they didn't know how to properly adapt it into a TV show. Critic William Hughes from The A.V. Club commented in a positive review: "The Witcher is by no means perfect; even ignoring the earlier structural flaws, its efforts at comedy often come off sounding a bit too modern for the rest of its setting, and the characters’ tendency to monologue to any unspeaking object or person they can find—horses, mute companions, literal dead babies—verges on comedic. But when the worst thing you can say about a series is that every episode ends up being better than the one that preceded it, that leaves an exciting amount of room to grow."

The Witcher author Andrzej Sapkowski commented favorably on the show, stating, "I was more than happy with Henry Cavill's appearance as The Witcher. He's a real professional. Just as Viggo Mortensen gave his face to Aragorn (in The Lord of the Rings), so Henry gave his to Geralt — and it shall be forever so." Sapkowski added, "I shall be happy if the viewers — and readers — take anything away, anything that shall enrich them in some way. Also, I sincerely hope to leave the viewers — and readers — hot. In every sense. Not tepid, not lukewarm." Craig Mathieson from The Age compared the series unfavorably to Game of Thrones and criticized the plot and fantasy tropes. Author Tom Long from The Detroit News praised the series for its action sequences an performances, and gave the show a grade of B rating. Matthew Aguilar from ComicBook.com gave a positive response by rating the show with 4 out of 5: "The Witcher brings the world's rich characters, sharp wit, and stylish action to life in a truly delightful way, and whether you're a fan of the novels or the games, you're going to find something to love." Critic Daniel D'Addario was more negative with the show and commented: "This is a show with moments of drama and of gruesome violence cut through with a glancing humor that too often feels tossed-off and out-of-place in the world the show has created."

Season 2
The second season received positive reviews. Rotten Tomatoes reports a 95% approval rating with an average rating of 7.9/10, based on 62 reviews. The website's critical consensus reads: "The Witchers second season expands on its first in all the best ways—and most importantly, it remains a whole lot of fun." Metacritic calculated a weighted average score of 69 out of 100 based on 23 critics, indicating "generally favorable reviews".

Critic Sheena Scott from Forbes favorably commented: "Throughout the episodes, characters repeatedly point out their resemblance—a similar attitude, the same hairstyle—to keep on reminding the viewers of their daughter-father bond. But as the ending of Season 2 indicates, it looks like it is this very bond that may be put into jeopardy in the next season." Angie Han from The Hollywood Reporter, praised the series for being an improvement over its previous season, although it may not be perfect. She commented the series: "In its second outing, The Witcher feels confident enough to open itself up to that whole array of feelings." In a more negative review, Roxana Hadadi from Vulture, stated "In its second season, The Witcher is most engaging when exploring the alliances and allegiances between Geralt, Yennefer, and Ciri and when using those three to consider Nivellen’s insistence that “Monsters are born of deeds alone. Unforgivable ones.” But in its attempt to build a bigger world, the series falls prey to more fantasy tropes than it masters." Author Leigh Butler deemed the second season as an improvement over its previous season, praising its deeper themes, better storyline, performances, and finally approaching its potential, and stated: "Season 2 (so far) is better, and working its way toward potentially great. When it comes down to it, there is really only one thing any story needs to accomplish, and The Witcher has accomplished it."

James Whitbrook from io9 said: "The new focus on character-building might mean less focus on specific short stories from Sapkowski’s collection of Witcher tales, but it makes the show’s world feel more expansive and nuanced in ways it didn’t until late in the show’s first season, while still keeping things centered on the characters as the sense of scale expands." Nick Schager in a negative review stated: "Even by typical fantasy-genre standards, the show indulges in so much make-believe terminology, and at such an incessant clip, that it quickly proves easier to give up trying to make heads or tails of every detail and instead just go with the wonky narrative flow.", while Allison Keene from Paste commented in a positive review: "More than anything though, The Witcher’s excellent Season 2 is a deeper dive into a rich world that shines in its focus on Ciri and Geralt’s relationship, and how that connection influences everything around them. Though there are plenty of things to quibble over from book to screen (or from videogame screen, although the show is expressly pulled from the page), The Witcher is perhaps best viewed and accepted as a fresh translation of an old fable." Critic Carly Lane from Collider gave a positive feedback: "By comparison, Season 2 is finally settling into its stride and has an even better sense of what works while discarding more of what didn't — although there are still the occasional unannounced time-jumps forward, or surprise character introductions, that demand attentiveness rather than any distracted background viewing."

Audience viewership
According to Parrot Analytics, The Witcher, in its US debut, was the third most "in demand" original streaming series, behind Stranger Things and The Mandalorian. Parrot's process measures "demand expressions", which is "its globally standardized TV-demand measurement unit that reflects the desire, engagement, and viewership of a series weighted by importance." On December 31, 2019, Parrot Analytics reported that The Witcher became the most-in-demand TV series in the world, across all platforms.

On December 30, 2019, Netflix issued a number of official lists, including the Most Popular TV Shows of 2019. The series was among the most viewed in the U.S. market, where The Witcher was ranked second among series. On January 21, 2020, Netflix announced that the first season had been viewed by over 76 million viewers on its service within its first month of release. Netflix had recently changed its viewership metric, from 70% of an episode under the previous metric, down to two minutes under the new metric. The new metric gives viewing figures 35% higher on average than the previous one. The 76million views in its first month based on the new metric (at least two minutes or more) is the largest for a Netflix series launch since the introduction of the new viewership metric.

The Witcher was, until the release of Bridgerton and Squid Game, Netflix's most watched original series launch at the time, with 541 million hours viewed in the first 28 days of release, and season two achieved 484 million hours watched.

Sales of The Witcher 3: Wild Hunt in December 2019 were 554% greater than those from December 2018, attributed to renewed interest in the series due to the show.

Accolades

Spin-offs

In January 2020, Netflix announced an animated spin-off film titled The Witcher: Nightmare of the Wolf, focusing on the origin story of Geralt's mentor and fellow witcher Vesemir. Lauren Schmidt Hissrich and Beau DeMayo worked on the film, with production by Studio Mir. It was released on August 23, 2021.

On September 25, 2021, a second animated feature film was announced.

A live-action prequel limited series, The Witcher: Blood Origin, was announced by Netflix in July 2020. Set 1200 years before Geralt's time, it shows the origin of the Witchers. Hissrich developed the prequel as executive producer, and Declan de Barra served as showrunner. In January 2021, Jodie Turner-Smith was set to star in the series. In March 2021, Laurence O'Fuarain joined the cast as a lead role. In April 2021, Turner-Smith left the series due to scheduling issue. In July 2021, Michelle Yeoh and Sophia Brown joined the cast. Filming was scheduled to begin in August 2021 in the United Kingdom, with Lenny Henry, Mirren Mack, Nathaniel Curtis, Dylan Moran, Jacob Collins-Levy, Lizzie Annis, Huw Novelli, Francesca Mills, Amy Murray and Zach Wyatt joined the cast. The series premiered on December 25, 2022, and consists of four episodes.

On September 25, 2021, a family-friendly animated series was announced.

References

External links
 
 

2010s American drama television series
2019 American television series debuts
2020s American drama television series
American action adventure television series
American fantasy drama television series
Dark fantasy television series
High fantasy television series
English-language Netflix original programming
Nudity in television
Polish drama television series
Polish fantasy television series
Serial drama television series
Television about magic
Television shows based on Polish novels
Television shows filmed in Austria
Television shows filmed in Hungary
Television shows filmed in Poland
Television shows filmed in Spain
Television shows filmed in the United Kingdom
The Witcher
Television productions suspended due to the COVID-19 pandemic
Nonlinear narrative television series
Witchcraft in television
Wizards in television
Television series based on novels